Lockwood is a city in Dade County, Missouri, United States. The population was 846 at the 2020 census.

History
Lockwood was platted in 1881. The community was named after J. E. Lockwood, a railroad official. A post office has been in operation at Lockwood since 1881.

Geography
Lockwood is located at  (37.386502, -93.954046).

Climate

Demographics

2010 census
As of the census of 2010, there were 936 people, 381 households, and 244 families living in the city. The racial makeup of the city was 96.6% White, 0.3% African American, 1.2% Native American, 0.7% Asian, and 1.2% from two or more races. Hispanic or Latino of any race were 1.3% of the population.

There were 381 households, of which 28.6% had children under the age of 18 living with them, 47.0% were married couples living together, 11.5% had a female householder with no husband present, 5.5% had a male householder with no wife present, and 36.0% were non-families. 34.6% of all households were made up of individuals, and 19.7% had someone living alone who was 65 years of age or older. The average household size was 2.32 and the average family size was 2.93.

The median age in the city was 43.9 years. 23.6% of residents were under the age of 18; 6.8% were between the ages of 18 and 24; 20.5% were from 25 to 44; 24.6% were from 45 to 64; and 24.6% were 65 years of age or older. The gender makeup of the city was 47.5% male and 52.5% female.

2000 census
As of the census of 2000, there were 989 people, 409 households, and 283 families living in the city. The population density was 1,070.3 people per square mile (415.1/km2). There were 468 housing units at an average density of 506.5 per square mile (196.4/km2). The racial makeup of the city was 97.57% White, 1.01% Native American, 0.40% Asian, and 1.01% from two or more races. Hispanic or Latino of any race were 0.51% of the population.

There were 409 households, out of which 31.5% had children under the age of 18 living with them, 57.7% were married couples living together, 8.8% had a female householder with no husband present, and 30.8% were non-families. 29.8% of all households were made up of individuals, and 20.5% had someone living alone who was 65 years of age or older. The average household size was 2.42 and the average family size was 3.00.

In the city the population was spread out, with 24.5% under the age of 18, 8.5% from 18 to 24, 27.2% from 25 to 44, 17.2% from 45 to 64, and 22.6% who were 65 years of age or older. The median age was 39 years. For every 100 females, there were 84.9 males. For every 100 females age 18 and over, there were 79.1 males.

The median income for a household in the city was $26,125, and the median income for a family was $32,794. Males had a median income of $22,857 versus $19,583 for females. The per capita income for the city was $13,439. About 10.6% of families and 15.8% of the population were below the poverty line, including 19.7% of those under age 18 and 19.3% of those age 65 or over.

Education
Public education in Lockwood is administered by Lockwood R-I School District.

Lockwood has a lending library, the Lockwood Public Library.

References

External links
 Historic maps of Lockwood in the Sanborn Maps of Missouri Collection at the University of Missouri

Cities in Dade County, Missouri
Cities in Missouri